Ugo Colombo may refer to:

 Ugo Colombo (cyclist) (born 1940), Italian racing cyclist
 Ugo Colombo (real estate) (born 1961), Italian-born American residential and commercial real estate developer